The 2001 season was the 71st completed season of Finnish Football League Championship, known as the Veikkausliiga.  At the same time it was the 12th season of the Veikkausliiga.

Overview
The Veikkausliiga is administered by the Finnish Football Association and the competition's 2001 season was contested by 12 teams. Tampere United won the championship and qualified for the 2002–03 UEFA Champions League qualification round, while the second and third placed teams qualified for the first qualification round of the 2002–03 UEFA Cup. The fourth placed team qualified for the UEFA Intertoto Cup 2002, while the two lowest placed teams of the competition, FC Jokerit and RoPS Rovaniemi were relegated to the Ykkönen.

Participating clubs 

In 2001 there were 12 participants in the Veikkausliiga:

 Atlantis Helsinki - Promoted from Ykkönen 
 FC Jazz Pori 
 FC Lahti 
 Haka Valkeakoski 
 HJK Helsinki 
 Inter Turku 
 Jokerit Helsinki 
 KuPS Kuopio - Promoted from Ykkönen
 MyPa 47 Anjalankoski 
 RoPS Rovaniemi   
 Tampere United
 VPS Vaasa

League standings

Promotion/relegation playoff

Jaro Pietarsaari - Jokerit Helsinki  1-1
Jokerit Helsinki - Jaro Pietarsaari  3-4

Jaro Pietarsaari promoted, Jokerit Helsinki relegated.

Results
Each team plays three times against every other team, either twice at home and once away or once at home and twice away, for a total of 33 matches played each.

Matches 1–22

Matches 23–33

Leading scorers

Footnotes

References
Finland - List of final tables (RSSSF)

Veikkausliiga seasons
Fin
Fin
1